St. Andrew's, an independent co-educational Catholic High School of approximately 475 Grade 8–12 students, serves young men and women from Greater Victoria.

History
The school was founded in 1863 as St. Louis College, a Catholic boys' school taught by the Oblate Fathers. Initially located on Humboldt Street, it soon moved to a permanent location on Pandora Avenue, where it was the first brick building in Victoria. In 1915, responsibility for the school was given over to the Congregation of Christian Brothers. The Christian Brothers departed in 1968, at which point the school became co-educational and was renamed to St. Andrews School. In 1984 the school moved to its current location and became St. Andrew's Regional High School.

Independent school status 
St. Andrew's Regional High School is classified as a Group 1 school under British Columbia's Independent School Act. It receives 50% funding from the Ministry of Education. The school receives no funding for capital costs. It is under charge of the Catholic Independent Schools of the Roman Catholic Diocese of Victoria.

Feeder Parishes

St. Joseph's (Victoria) Elementary
St. Joseph's (Chemainus) Elementary
St. Patrick's Elementary
Queen of Angels School
John Paul II School - Port Alberni

Academic performance 
St. Andrew's Regional is ranked by the Fraser Institute. In 2007, it is ranked 53rd out of 298 British Columbia high schools.

96.4% of the students graduate and 85%+ of those students go on to study at colleges and universities across the country.

Academic departments

Mathematics
Performing Arts
Social Studies
Catholic theology
English
Humanities
Information technologies
Languages
Science
Physical Education
Visual Arts

Athletic performance

School teams

Soccer 
Volleyball 
Track & Field 
Basketball 
Cross Country
Badminton
Rowing
Golf
Swimming

Artistic performance

Performing arts

Drama
Concert Choir
Concert Band
Jazz Band

Visual arts

Art
Photography
Yearbook

Notable alumni 
 Dave Calder (2000), Canadian Olympic Team Rowing Medalist
 Shaun Sipos (2000), Actor (Melrose Place, ER, Southland, CSI: Miami, Smallville).
 Fraser MacPherson (1946), Jazz Musician

References

External links
 St. Andrew's Regional High School
 The Fraser Institute School Performance Report Cards

Catholic secondary schools in British Columbia
Private schools in British Columbia
Educational institutions established in 1983
1983 establishments in British Columbia